Arther Ferrill (born 1938), now a professor emeritus of history at the University of Washington at Seattle, is a respected expert on Ancient Rome and military history.  He has written four books and is a regular contributor to MHQ: The Quarterly Journal of Military History and other periodicals, as an author and in review of other authors.

Life and work
Born in Enid, Oklahoma, Ferrill earned a B.A. at the University of Wichita (now Wichita State University) in 1960. He went on to graduate study at the  University of Illinois at Urbana-Champaign, where he received a masters in 1961 and a Ph.D. in 1964.

In The Fall of the Roman Empire: The Military Explanation (1998 ), Ferrill supports the claims of Vegetius, about increased "barbarisation" and "germanisation" helping to cause the collapse of the Western Roman Empire in the fifth  century AD. He asserts that allowing barbarians to settle within Rome's borders, to act as a buffer zone against other barbarians, created friction and led to a decrease in the size of the Roman Empire's Borders. He also states that the Germans were recruited in such large numbers by the Western empire that they in fact changed it from a Roman to a German culture. For example, field army units would not use their helmets, the pilum was replaced, and the standard of drill declined, leading to a lack of military skill within the Empire.

Among his other works are:
Caligula: Emperor of Rome. Thames & Hudson, 1991. 
The Origins of War: From the Stone Age to Alexander the Great.  Thames & Hudson, 1985. Revised edition, Westview Press, 1997. 
Roman Imperial Grand Strategy. University Press of America, 1991.

References

External links
Faculty profile University of Washington, Seattle
University of Washington List of Works by Arther Ferill
Britannica Online review of "The Origins of War" by Arther Ferrill
Britannica Online another review of "The Origins of War" by Arther Ferrill
The Journal of Military History Vol. 63, Iss. 2 "The Status of Ancient Military History: Traditional Work, Recent Research, and On-going Controversies" by Victor Davis Hanson
University of Utah (online) “Some Observations Regarding the Possible Psychology of the Greek Hoplite, or the Face of Classical Greek Infantry Battle” by John Loveland
US Naval Institute (online) "Legion Lessons for Today's Marines", by Major William J. Bowers, U.S. Marine Corps, November 2001 (see bibliography)
University of Michigan (online) "Cruelty and Immorality in Rome: The Times of Caligula, Messalina, and Nero" by Mohamed Fawaz (see bibliography)
"such renowned scholars as Thomas Pressly, Jon Bridgman and Arthur Ferrill." (April 2006, UCLA)

American military historians
American male non-fiction writers
Historians of ancient Rome
Living people
1938 births
Writers from Enid, Oklahoma
University of Illinois Urbana-Champaign alumni
Wichita State University alumni
University of Washington faculty